Odostomia lukisii is a species of sea snail, a marine gastropod mollusc in the family Pyramidellidae, the pyrams and their allies.

Description
The size of the shell varies between 1.5 mm and 4 mm.

Distribution
This species occurs in the following locations:
 Atlantic Ocean : off the Azores and West Africa.
 European waters (ERMS scope)
 United Kingdom Exclusive Economic Zone
 Mediterranean Sea : Greek Exclusive Economic Zone and Southwest Coast of Apulia

References

External links
 
 To Biodiversity Heritage Library (3 publications)
 To CLEMAM
 To Encyclopedia of Life
 To USNM Invertebrate Zoology Mollusca Collection
 To World Register of Marine Species

lukisii
Gastropods described in 1859